Rumpler-Luftfahrzeugbau GmbH, Rumpler-Werke, usually known simply as Rumpler was a German aircraft and automobile manufacturer founded in Berlin by Austrian engineer Edmund Rumpler in 1909 as Rumpler Luftfahrzeugbau.  The firm originally manufactured copies of the Etrich Taube monoplane under the Rumpler Taube trademark, but turned to building reconnaissance biplanes of its own design through the course of the First World War, in addition to a smaller number of fighters and bombers. 

The company, from the beginning a limited liability concern (GmbH), became a Aktiengesellschaft in the style of Rumpler-Werke AG on 21 September 1917 with a capitalization of 3,5 million Marks. In 1918, 3300 people worked for Rumpler at the Berlin headquarter and a subsidiary in Augsburg, the Bayerische Rumpler-Werke AG.
 
As a consequence of the Treaty of Versailles Germany was not allowed to manufacture aircraft. Rumpler instead attempted to secure a place in the post-war automobile market, which lead to the development of a vehicle with the first effective aerodynamic chassis, the Rumpler Tropfenwagen, on the premises of its Augsburg subsidiary. It was shown at the 1921 Internationale Automobil Ausstellung which then took place in Berlin. The car failed to attract sufficient sales and the Bayerische Rumpler-Werke AG went into receivership in 1923, followed by the  Rumpler-Werke AG in Berlin in 1925. The assets were liquidated in 1926, with the Augsburg premises bought 30 July 1926 by the Bayerische Flugzeugwerke, predecessor of BMW.

Aircraft

 Rumpler 6B
 Rumpler B.I
 Rumpler C.I
 Rumpler C.III
 Rumpler C.IV
 Rumpler C.V
 Rumpler C.VI
 Rumpler C.VII
 Rumpler C.VIII
 Rumpler C.X
 Rumpler D.I
 Rumpler G.I
 Rumpler G.II
 Rumpler G.III

See also
 List of aircraft manufacturers
 List of Rumpler Aircraft
 Rumpler Tropfenwagen

Notes

References
 
 
 

Companies of Prussia
Defunct aircraft manufacturers of Germany
Defunct motor vehicle manufacturers of Germany
Manufacturing companies based in Berlin